Filipowice  is a village in the administrative district of Gmina Koszyce, within Proszowice County, Lesser Poland Voivodeship, in southern Poland.

The village has a population of 141.

References

Filipowice